Sault College of Applied Arts and Technology is a publicly funded college in Sault Ste. Marie, Ontario. It began in 1965 as the Ontario Vocational Centre. Today, Sault College offers full-time and part-time opportunities for students in post-secondary, apprenticeship, adult retraining, continuing education, and contract training program categories. Sault College's full-time and part-time enrollment totals about 4,500 registrants annually.

History 

In the fall of 1965, the institution opened its doors as the Sault Ste. Marie Ontario Vocational Centre (OVC). Similar vocational schools began in London (now Fanshawe College) and Ottawa (now Algonquin College). In 1967 the Ontario government established a public system of Colleges of Applied Arts & Technology as an evolution of the OVC system. The college was established during the formation of Ontario's college system. Colleges of Applied Arts and Technology were established on May 21, 1965.

Sault Ste. Marie's OVC became the Sault Campus of the newly established Cambrian College, whose main campus was located in Sudbury. A second satellite campus opened in North Bay. Colleges enjoyed immediate public acceptance and support. In fact, Cambrian's enrollment growth was so rapid that within only five years the satellites became independent colleges. The independent Sault College of Applied Arts & Technology emerged in 1973, while Cambrian's campus in North Bay became Canadore College.

Sault College has grown tremendously over the years, adding programs in all disciplines. They now respond to the postsecondary educational needs of more than 4,500 part-time and full-time students each year. Sault College offers education in a number of areas including: Apprenticeship, Aviation, Business, Community Integration through Co-operative Education (CICE), Community Services, Continuing Education, Culinary and Hospitality, Engineering Technology, General Arts and Science, Health Programs, Information Technology Studies, Justice Studies, Language and Communication, Media and Design, Native Education, Natural Environment and Outdoor Studies, Salon and Spa Services, Skilled Trades, Transportation, and Marine Engine Training Programs.

Sault College often shares resources with Lake Superior State University.

Campus 
The Sault College campus is currently undergoing upgrades. The Algoma Public Health Building on campus has been built to in cooperation to serve the community of Sault Ste. Marie while being a comfortable location for students in the Nursing program to learn. Essar Hall, which opened in 2011, acts as the main entrance to Sault College. The state of the art facility was built to encompass the elements of the Northern Ontario location. The building was named after Essar Steel Algoma, which donated $1 million towards the ‘Inspiring Growth’ capital campaign for Sault College.

Opening in September 2013, The Sault College Health and Wellness Centre will serve the students’ needs for healthy active life styles, study space, food and drink, as well as the new home of the Sault College Cougars Athletic Department.

Future projects include the construction of a new residence building for the growing student housing needs and ‘The Common Link’. The Common Link, named after the current president of the college, Dr. Common, will act as a connection between the current campus and the new Health and Wellness Centre.

Enji Maawnjiding 

Enji Maawnjiding ("Where we gather") is an Anishinaabe meeting centre located on the campus, a home away from home for local and out of town students. The centre is the focal point of Sault College's Indigenous student population. Used on a day-to-day basis as a student lounge, Enji Maawnjiding also hosts a number of social and cultural events. Located outside Enji Maawnjiding there is a traditional medicine garden, as well as a sacred arbour and sweat lodge.

Student Health & Wellness Centre 

The new $12.5 million Student Health & Wellness Centre is a 40,000 square foot facility consisting of:

Academic labs to enhance student learning
Fitness rooms to promote student & employee health and wellness
Meeting space to host the sharing of ideas and information
New gymnasium to better accommodate varsity sports
New Student Life Centre

Along with offering a greatly improved fitness and recreation area for students and community members, this project is critical to the curriculum of the college in programs of study such as:

Police Foundations
Protection Security and Investigation
Occupational Therapy Assistant/Physiotherapy Assistant
Fitness & Health Promotion.

Athletics 
The Sault Cougars play in the Ontario Colleges Athletic Association West Division. While the Men's and Women's Hockey teams play in the American Collegiate Hockey Association
 Men's Baseball
 Curling
 Men's Soccer
 Women's Soccer
 Cross Country
 Men's Hockey
 Women's Hockey

There is also on campus recreational sports organized by students and staff at Sault College.
 Ball Hockey
 Curling Fun Spiel
 Dodge Ball
 Indoor Soccer
 Beach Volleyball
 3 on 3 Basketball
 Volleyball
 Golf Tournament
 Road Hockey
 Ultimate Frisbee

Aircraft Fleet 
Sault College is home of one of the best recognized aviation programs in Canada, the program provides Integrated Commercial Pilot License Aircraft including a multi-engine instrument rating (CPL (A)IR).

13xZlin Z-242L
3xPiper PA-44 Seminole

Child Care 
Child care services on-campus at Sault College accommodate children from 18 months to 5 years. The licensed Child Development Centre is staffed by qualified Early Childhood Educators who are assisted by students. The service is open to the community as well as the student parents of Sault College.

Timmie Cam 
During the 2012–2013 school year, Sault College introduced the 'Timmies Cam'. This option in the college's online portal allowed for students, faculty, and staff to scan the Tim Horton's area, via web cam, before venturing to the very busy coffee shop. The idea was created through the observation of a tweet that indicated that the line ups were always so long and that they wished they had a way to know when it wasn't busy. Sault College noticed this and introduced the service to help the busy flow of traffic through Tim Horton's.

See also 
 Higher education in Ontario
 List of colleges in Ontario

References

External links 

 Sault College
 Cougars Athletics
 Sault College Students' Union
 Contact North

1965 establishments in Ontario
Colleges in Ontario
Educational institutions established in 1965
Education in Sault Ste. Marie, Ontario
Buildings and structures in Sault Ste. Marie, Ontario